Atithi (The Guest) is a 2002 Indian Kannada language film directed by P. Sheshadri. The film deals with terrorism and the psychology of the terrorist. The 9/11 US tragedy and a car blast in Bangalore inspired the director Sheshadri to make a film about the psychology of terrorism.

Plot
The film opens with a minister inaugurating a new flyover. The flyover is then bombed by a man along with his associates resulting in many deaths. The film moves to a village, where a well revered Doctor lives. He lives alone with his wife while his son lives in some other city. The Terrorist gets wounded while making a bomb. His associates are then forced to take him to the doctor's clinic where they kidnap his wife.

They threaten to kill her if the doctor calls the police or tells anyone. During the days the Terrorist is healing, there are many close calls. He meets and becomes friends with a girl who regularly visits the Doctor. He and the Doctor have chats about his objectives.

He and his associates plan to bomb a dam being visited by the chief minister of the state. Some school children will also go there. He hurts the little girl, his friend who was also supposed to go there in order to save her.

The Doctor confronts him and tries to persuade him not to do this task. However, the Terrorist does not listen. On the day of the bombing, the Terrorist return the Doctor's wife and head to the dam. The Doctor tries one last time to stop the Terrorist by threatening to shoot him. However, the Terrorist calls his bluff.

While heading to the dam, the terrorists run into some school children, when the Terrorist see the girl who he made friends with. He asks his associates to go another road as he wants to think.

The films then ends, not revealing whether the terrorists carried out their attack or not.

Cast
 Prakash Rai as Unnamed Terrorist
 H. G. Dattatreya as Doctor
 Lakshmi Chandrashekar as Doctor's Wife
 Baby Raksha as Putti
 C. R. Shashikumar as Police Inspector
 Dinesh Mangalore as Terrorist 1
 Ramesh Pandit as Terrorist 2
 Kalpana Naganath as Putti's Mother

Production
Prakash Rai reportedly charged just one rupee to act in this film.

Critical reception
The film was well received by the critics. Critics were particularly unequivocal in their praise of the approach to a complex subject such as terrorism. Though the film had terrorism as the theme, there was no throttling noise of blasts and guns.

Awards and screening

2002 The film was selected for Indian Panorama in International Film Festival of India, Goa
2003 Screened at Cairo International Film Festival
 2001: 49th National Film Awards: Best Film in Kannada
 Six Karnataka State Awards, entry in International Film Festivals of India, Kerala, Mumbai, Flanders (Belgium), Palm Springs (USA),

See also
P. Sheshadri

References

External links
 

2002 films
2000s Kannada-language films
Films about terrorism in India
Best Kannada Feature Film National Film Award winners
Films directed by P. Sheshadri